The State Prizes of the Soviet Republics were each republic counterpart to the USSR State Prize. Each republic granted several different prizes, generally named after writers or artists from the republic, as well as a blanket Komsomol prize for young artists.

Republics
 Russian SFSR
 Maxim Gorky (literature)
 Konstantin Stanislavski (theatre)
 Mikhail Glinka (music)
 Vasili Bazhenov (architecture)
 Ilya Repin (fine arts)
 Brothers Vasilyev (cinema)
 Nadezhda Krupskaya (art and literature for children)
 Ukrainian SSR
 Taras Shevchenko
 Pavlo Tychyna
 Maksym Rylsky
 Lesya Ukrainka
 Nikolai Ostrovsky
 Belarusian SSR
Yanka Kupala (literature)
Yakub Kolas
Panteleymon Lepeshinsky
 Uzbek SSR
 Alisher Navoiy
 Kazakh SSR
Abay Qunanbayuli (literature)
Kurmangazy (music)
Kulyash Baiseitova 
 Georgian SSR
 Shota Rustaveli
 Azerbaijan SSR: 
 Mirza Akhundov (literature)
 Uzeyir Hajibeyov (music)
 Lithuanian SSR
 Žemaitė (literature)
 Pranas Zibertas 
 Moldavian SSR
Boris Glavan
 Latvian SSR
 Eduards Veidenbaums (literature)
 Mirdza Ķempe
 Kyrgyz SSR
Toktogul Satylganov
Mayramkan Abylkasymova
 Tajik SSR
Rudaki
 Armenian SSR
 Aram Khatchaturian (music)
 A. Danielyan
 Turkmen SSR
 Makhtumkuli 
 Estonian SSR
 Juhan Smuul (literature)

ASSRs
The Autonomous Republics (ASSRs) also had their state prizes; a sample: 
 Abkhaz ASSR
 Darmit Gulia
 Bashkir ASSR
 Salawat Yulayev
 Chuvash ASSR
 Konstantin Ivanov
 Dagestan ASSR
 Suleiman Stalsky
 Kalmyk ASSR
 Oka Gorodovikov
 Karakalpak ASSR
 Berdakh
 Karelian ASSR
 Arhippa Perttunen
 Komi ASSR
 Ivan Kuratov
 Viktor Savin
 Mari ASSR
 Sergei Chavain
 Tatar ASSR
 Ğabdulla Tuqay
 Yakut ASSR
 Platon Oyunsky

See also
Awards and decorations of the Soviet Union

Soviet awards